was a general in the Imperial Japanese Army during World War II. He was convicted of war crimes and was executed by hanging. Mutō was implicated in both the Nanjing Massacre and the Manila massacre.

Biography

Mutō was a native of Hakusui, Kumamoto, and a graduate of the 25th class of the Imperial Japanese Army Academy in 1913. He graduated from the 32nd class of the Army Staff College in 1920. Mutō was assigned as a military attaché to Germany from 1923–1926. On his return to Japan, he served in various administrative and staff positions within the Imperial Army General Staff Office.

Mutō was on the strategic planning staff of the General Staff Office in 1935, and was chief of the military intelligence section of the Kwantung Army at the time of the Marco Polo Bridge Incident. He is believed to have been one of the planners behind the incident which sparked the Second Sino-Japanese War.

Promoted to Vice Chief of Staff of the Japanese Central China Area Army, Mutō was in China for many of the initial campaigns of the conflict, and was later charged with having led troops during the worst excesses of the Nanking Massacre. Mutō was recalled to Japan in 1939, promoted to major general in 1939, and served on the Military Affairs Bureau of the Ministry of War.

Promoted to lieutenant general just prior to the start of the Pacific War, Mutō served as director of the Military Affairs Bureau at the time of the attack on Pearl Harbor. He was assigned command of the Second Imperial Guards Division at Singapore in April 1942. He was later assigned to command Japanese forces on Sumatra in Japanese -occupied Netherlands East Indies from June 1944, and was transferred to the Philippines in October 1944, where he was appointed chief of staff of the Japanese Fourteenth Area Army under General Tomoyuki Yamashita.

He was accused of having conducted a campaign of slaughter, torture and other atrocities against the Filipino civilian population, prisoners of war and civilian internees, and by ordering guerrilla containment.

After the surrender of Japan, Mutō was arrested by the American occupation authorities and charged with war crimes before the International Military Tribunal for the Far East. He was convicted for atrocities against civilians and prisoners of war in both China and the Philippines, and was executed by hanging on 23 December 1948.

References

Books

External links

Notes

1892 births
1948 deaths
People from Kumamoto Prefecture
Imperial Japanese Army generals of World War II
Nanjing Massacre perpetrators
Japanese people convicted of the international crime of aggression
Japanese people executed for war crimes
Executed military leaders
People executed by the International Military Tribunal for the Far East
Executed mass murderers